Garvey's Ghost is the fourth album by the reggae artist Burning Spear, released in 1976 on Island Records, ILPS 9382. Each track is a dub version of its correspondent song on his third album, Marcus Garvey.

Content
This album was fashioned by Island Record engineers John Burns and Dick Cuthell in their Hammersmith studio. It features prominently the backing musicians, whom Lindo named The Black Disciples band, assembled from members of the session group The Soul Syndicate and Bob Marley's touring band, The Wailers.

On July 27, 2010, this album was remastered and released by Universal's Hip-O Records reissue imprint in tandem with the original Marcus Garvey LP on one compact disc.

Track listing
All tracks written by Winston Rodney and Phillip Fullwood except as indicated.

 "The Ghost" — 3:56
 "I and I Survive" — 3:55
 "Black Wa-Da-Da" (W. Rodney, C. Paisley, P. Fullwood) — 3:53
 "John Burns Skank" (Marcus Rodney, Mackba Rodney, Winston Rodney) — 3:49
 "Brain Food" (W. Rodney) — 3:11
 "Farther East of Jack" — 4:26
 "2000 Years" (D. Hines, R. Willington, W. Rodney) — 3:49
 "Dread River" (W. Rodney, M. Lawrence, P. Fullwood) — 3:13
 "Workshop" (A. Folkes, W. Rodney, P. Fullwood) — 4:34
 "Reggaelation" (W. Rodney) — 3:43

Musicians
 Winston Rodney - lead vocals
 Delroy Hines - harmony vocals
 Rupert Willington - harmony vocals
 Bobby Ellis - trumpet
 Vincent "Trommie" Gordon - trombone, clavinet
 Carlton "Sam" Samuels - flute
 Herman Marquis - alto saxophone
 Richard "Dirty Harry" Hall - tenor saxophone
 Tyrone "Organ D" Downie - piano, organ
 Bernard "Touter" Harvey - piano, organ, clavinet
 Earl "Chinna" Smith - lead guitar
 Valentine "Tony" Chin – rhythm guitar
 Robbie "Rabbi" Shakespeare - bass
 Aston "Family Man" Barrett - bass
 Leroy "Horsemouth" Wallace - drums

Production credits
 Engineers:  George Philpott and Errol Thompson
 Dubbing engineers:  John Burns and Dick Cuthell
 Recorded at Randy's Recording Studio, North Parade, Kingston, Jamaica
 Mixed at Joe Gibbs Studio, Retirement Crescent, Kingston, Jamaica
 Dub mix at Island Studios, Hammersmith
 Special thanks to Lloyd Coxone

References

Burning Spear albums
1976 albums
Dub albums
Island Records albums